The Hilton Athens was a hotel in Athens, Greece. Opened in 1963, it closed for renovations in January 2022 and will reopen in 2024. It is on Vassilissis Sofias Avenue, within the Hilton Area, adjacent to the Kolonaki and Pangrati neighbourhoods. The new destination will introduce a mixed-use development: It will feature a luxury hotel along with residences, a lifestyle members’ club, multiple culinary and entertainment venues and curated shopping.

History

The Athens Hilton was constructed from 1958-1963, as Athens' first international chain hotel. It was designed by a team of architects including Emmanuel Vourekas, Prokopis Vasileiadis, Anthony Georgiades and Spyro Staikos. Artist Yiannis Moralis, inspired by Greek themes, designed the reliefs on the building's façade.

Conrad Hilton was present at the opening ceremony, on April 20th, 1963. Guests at the hotel included Greek shipping magnate Aristotle Onassis, singer Frank Sinatra, director Ingmar Bergman and actor Anthony Quinn. Hilton Athens was the headquarters for the International Olympic Committee during the 2004 Summer Olympics. In 2011 the organizing committee of the 2011 Special Olympics World Summer Games used the hotel as their base of operations.

The hotel hosted Athens’ first contemporary art gallery, the Hilton Gallery, in cooperation with Marilena Liacopoulou. From 1968 until 1972 the Hilton Gallery was responsible for various historical exhibitions. In more recent years, the hotel displayed artworks and invested regularly in lobby exhibitions of artists from Greece and abroad.

In 2003, anticipating the 2004 Summer Olympic Games, Hilton Athens was renovated by Greek architects Alexandros Tombazis and Charis Bougadelis. The establishment was refurbished, and a new seven-storey northern wing was added. 

In 2016, Ionian Hotels, the company owning the hotel, was sold by Alpha Bank, which had foreclosed on the property. The Greek TEMES S.A. hotel organization and the Turkish-based Dogus Group partnered 50/50 to buy the hotel for € 76.1 million. In 2019, TEMES bought a controlling interest in the hotel, raising their stake to 51%, while their partner, Olayan Group, bought out the remaining 49% interest held by Dogus.

The hotel closed in January 31, 2022 for comprehensive renovations. It is set to reopen in 2024 featuring Conrad Athens hotel, part of Hilton's luxury Conrad Hotels division. The hotel portion of the building will be reduced from 506 rooms to 280 rooms. The remainder of the hotel will be converted to 50 luxury residences, which will be sold under the "Conrad Residences" and "Waldorf Astoria Residences" brands.

Facilities

The hotel had a restaurant and rooftop bar. It had a spa and a 25m by 15m outdoor swimming pool.

References

External links
 

Hotels in Athens
Hilton Hotels & Resorts hotels
Hotels established in 1963